Greenfield Mountain is a summit in Herkimer County, New York in the Adirondack Mountains. It is located north-northwest of Little Rapids in the Town of Webb. Deer Mountain is located southeast and Partlow Mountain is located west of Greenfield Mountain.

References

Mountains of Herkimer County, New York
Mountains of New York (state)